Entry Islands may refer to:

 Nattiqtuut formerly the Entry Islands, Kitikmeot Region, Nunavut
 Entry Islands (Qikiqtaaluk Region, Nunavut)

May also refer to:
Entry Island, an island off the coast of Quebec in the Magdalen Islands archipelago. 
Entry Island, an island off the coast of Fiordland in New Zealand the waters around which are protected by the Moana Uta (Wet Jacket Arm) Marine Reserve